Papyrus Harris I is also known as the Great Harris Papyrus and (less accurately) simply the Harris Papyrus (though there are a number of other papyri in the Harris collection). Its technical designation is Papyrus British Museum EA 9999. At 41 metres long, it is "the longest known papyrus from Egypt, with some 1,500 lines of text." It was found in a tomb near Medinet Habu, across the Nile river from Luxor, Egypt, and purchased by collector Anthony Charles Harris (1790–1869) in 1855; it entered the collection of the British Museum in 1872.

Its editio princeps is the 1876 "Facsimile of an Egyptian Hieratic papyrus of the reign of Ramses III" published by the British Museum.

Text
The hieratic text of the papyrus consists of a list of temple endowments and a brief summary of the entire reign (1186–1155 BC) of king Ramesses III of the Twentieth dynasty of Egypt. Ramesses III claims to have captured hundreds of thousands of foreign slaves;

“I brought back in great numbers those that my sword has spared, with their hands tied behind their backs before my horses, and their wives and children in tens of thousands, and their livestock in hundreds of thousands. I imprisoned their leaders in fortresses bearing my name, and I added to them chief archers and tribal chiefs, branded and enslaved, tattooed with my name, their wives and children being treated in the same way.”

Its historical section mentions that Setnakhte, Ramesses III's father and predecessor, restored order and stability to Egypt after a time of internal civil conflict, expelling Asiatic followers of Irsu. Ramesses III himself reorganized the state bureaucracy and the army. He fought wars against the Peoples of the Sea and claims to have subdued them and made them subjects of Egypt. The Edomites too were subjugated. In the west he stopped the incursions of the Libyans and Meshwesh and settled them in the western Nile delta. His economic activities included the digging of a great well at Ayan, an expedition to Punt, an ill-defined region in the Horn of Africa, the importation of copper from Atika, and an expedition to the Sinai peninsula which returned with precious stones. Improving the quality of life of the ordinary Egyptian he had trees planted for shade, he protected women so they might go freely wherever they wanted, and, when Egypt was at peace, its foreign mercenaries lived with their families in garrison towns. Overall, he was convinced of having greatly bettered the lot of all inhabitants of Egypt, natives or foreigners.

The text itself was composed during the reign of Ramesses IV, Ramesses III's son and successor.

See also
 List of ancient Egyptian papyri
Rhind Mathematical Papyrus
Papyrus Harris 500

Footnotes

References
Erichsen, Wolja. 1933. Papyrus Harris I: hieroglyphische Transkription. Bibliotheca aegyptiaca 5. Brussel: Fondation égyptologique reine Élisabeth
Grandet, Pierre. 1994. Le papyrus Harris I (BM 9999). 2 vols. Bibliothèque d'Étude 109/1–2. Cairo: Imprimerie de l'Institut français d'archéologie orientale du Caire
Grandet, Pierre. 1999. Le papyrus Harris I: Glossaire. Bibliothèque d'Étude 129. Cairo: Imprimerie de l'Institut français d'archéologie orientale du Caire
Breasted, James Henry. 1906. Ancient Records of Egypt, Chicago, Part Four, §§ 151 to 412

External links
British Museum webpage on the Papyrus
British Museum webpage on a scene from the Papyrus
August Eisenlohr's German edition of the Harris Papyrus at the Internet Archive

Extra-biblical references to Canaan
Ancient Egyptian objects in the British Museum
Egyptian papyri